The M. O. Auezov South Kazakhstan State University also known as Mukhtar Auezov South Kazakhstan University, is a multidisciplinary higher educational institution in the city of Shymkent, which provides training in 76 technical and humanitarian specialties. It was founded in 1943.

History 
The university is named after the popular Kazakh writer and social activist Mukhtar Omarkhanuli Auezov. During the height of the World War II in the Soviet Union, the Council of People's Commissars of the USSR on 19 June 1943 decided to establish the ''Technological Institute of Building Materials' in accordance with Resolution No. 679B. On June 29 of the same year, the All-Union Committee for Higher Education under the USSR People's Commissariat and the USSR Commissioner for Building Materials issued an order "On the organization of the Technological Institute of Building Materials in Chimkent, Kazakh SSR."

The building of the pedagogical school on Sovetskaya Street (now Kazybek Bi) was transferred to the university. Konstantin Delyaur from Kharkiv was appointed the head of the newly opened school. He is considered to have made a great contribution to the opening of the institute, bringing to the highest authorities the need for urgent training of qualified specialists needed in the construction industry.

In 2021, the university was named as one of the top 500 universities in the world.

Faculties 

 Agroindustrial Faculty
 Natural-pedagogical Faculty
 Faculty of Evening and Distance Learning
 Higher School of Information Technology
 Faculty of Light and Food Industry
 Faculty of Mechanics and Oil and Gas Business
 Faculty of Pedagogy
 Faculty of work with foreign students and pre-university training
 Faculty of Construction and Transport
 Faculty of Culture and Sports
 Faculty of Philology
 Faculty of Economics and Finance
 Faculty of Law and International Relations
 Faculty of Chemical Technology
 Military Department

References 

Universities in Kazakhstan